Hershey's Kisses is a brand of chocolate first produced by the Hershey Company in 1907. The bite-sized pieces of chocolate have a distinctive conical shape, sometimes described as flat-bottomed teardrops. Hershey's Kisses chocolates are wrapped in squares of lightweight aluminum foil. A narrow strip of paper (called a plume) sticks out from the top of each Hershey's Kiss wrapper. Originally designed as a flag for the "Hershey's" brand, the printed paper plumes were added to the Kisses product wrapper in 1921 in order to distinguish the Hershey's Kiss from its competitors who offered similar products.

History 

When first manufactured in 1907, Hershey's Kisses were wrapped by hand. In 1921, a machine was used so the Kisses would be wrapped automatically. This machinery also added the paper plume or paper strip flag to the aluminum foil wrapper to identify Hershey's Kisses, replacing the original small square of printed tissue that was inside the foil wrapper.

In 1924, Milton S. Hershey received a registered design trademark (Reg. 0186828) for "foil wrapped conical configuration with plume" which included the paper plume sticking out from the top of the aluminum foil wrapper. In 1976, Hershey received a registered trademark for the Hershey's Kisses foil wrapper.

During 1942, production of Hershey's Kisses was briefly interrupted due to the rationing of aluminum foil. Instead, the machines were re-purposed to create military chocolate D ration bars for the soldiers in World War II. By the end of World War II, Hershey's had produced more than three billion D ration chocolate bars.

Popularity
Kisses are one of the most popular brands of candies in the US. In 1989, the chocolate drops were the fifth most popular chocolate brand in the United States, spawning sales that topped $400 million. More than 70 million Hershey's Kisses chocolates are produced each day at the company's two factories. Today's Kisses brand chocolates use Hershey's original milk chocolate formula.

Kisses brand varieties

Though originally made of solely milk chocolate, many variations of the Kisses brand of chocolates and candies have since been introduced. Hershey introduces and discontinues new Kisses flavors constantly as part of its standard Kisses offering, including holidays. In addition to the standard milk chocolate, year-round varieties include caramel, Special Dark, hazelnut (deluxe), birthday cake, cookies'n'cream, milk chocolate almond, and white chocolate (Hugs). Seasonal varieties include cherry cordial, hot cocoa, mint truffle, sugar cookie, candy cane, lava cake, "vampire" milk chocolate with strawberry creme and Kisses Special Selections milk chocolate with strawberry creme, trufflee creme,  yogurt, and mocha cream.

Discontinued and Limited Edition Kisses 

Throughout the years, Hershey's has created many different flavors of kisses, most of which are currently discontinued. The following list, updated in December 2021, is not necessarily exhaustive.

Kissables 
Introduced in late 2005, these mini candy-coated milk chocolate kisses were similar to M&Ms and Reese's cups. Colors included red, orange, yellow, green, and blue, as well as pastels for Easter, pink, red, and white for Valentine's Day, and red, purple, and brown Special Dark Kissables. In 2008, Hershey's attempted to cut production costs by changing the recipe for these (and other chocolates), opting to use vegetable oils instead of cocoa butter. Customers were not pleased and this change ultimately led to the death of Kissables in July 2009.

Candy Corn Kisses 
These candy corn limited edition Halloween kisses were introduced in 2007, and had three layers of white chocolate flavored candy; yellow on bottom, orange in the middle, and a white tip. Discontinued in 2011, Hershey's opted not to bring them back for future Halloween's due to poor sales.

Strawberry Ice Cream Cone Kisses 
This Limited Edition flavor was only available for a few months around Easter 2021. Strawberry Ice Cream Cone kisses were available for purchase as of July 2022 at Hershey's Chocolate World.

Pumpkin Spice Kisses 
Released in fall of 2008, shortly following Hershey's Kiss 100th anniversary, this limited edition candy was well received by the public. The kisses had that iconic pumpkin spice smell; some compared it to snickerdoodles or ginger snaps. The orange kiss was filled with a white pumpkin-flavored creme, and wrapped in a special gold and brown foil wrapper.

Wrapper history and varieties

When introduced in 1907, Hershey's Kisses chocolates originally were wrapped by hand. The automated wrapping machinery was introduced in 1921.

The original wrapper was silver-colored foil and Hershey's Kisses were only available in this single color for decades. In 1962, Hershey became one of the first companies to change its wrappers for seasonal sales.  That was the first year that Kisses chocolates were available in different colored foil wrappers: red, green, and silver-wrapped candies were manufactured to coincide with the Christmas season. This idea was the suggestion of John Figi, owner of Figi's "Gifts in Good Taste"—a mail-order food gifts company based in Marshfield, Wisconsin. The green and red colored wrapped chocolates were featured for the first time in the Figi's Christmas catalog.

In 1968, pastel blue, pink, and green wrappers were introduced for Easter, and in 1986, Valentine's Day-themed wrappers of red and silver were introduced. Xs and Os have also appeared on pink and red wrappers as well as little red hearts on silver wrappers for Valentine's Day. "Fall Harvest" colors were introduced in 1991. Independence Day has silver with red stripes and blue-starred wrappers. Pink wrappers with "ribbons" on them to support breast cancer research have also appeared. Camouflage wrappers are also available, primarily on military bases. Kisses Dark Chocolates come in a deep purple wrapper.  The Halloween themed Kisses Candy Corn candies come in a wrapper whose colors imitate the color of a candy corn with yellow, white and orange stripes swirling around the candy.

In 2016, four limited Holiday wrapper varieties were released: Santa hats, Kissmas sweaters that resemble knit Christmas sweaters, Kissmas Trees with plumes that read "Fa La La", and "Kissmas" Presents with plumes that read from me to you. The Christmas themed Kisses Candy Cane candies also come in a wrapper whose colors imitate the color pattern (red stripes and white chocolate). The original silver (for regular) and gold (for almonds) wrappers are available year-round.

Paper plume

All Kisses wrappers have the paper strip called a plume as an identification tag sticking from the top of the foil wrapper.  When the paper plume was added to the Kisses wrapper in 1921, originally it was a flag for the "Hershey's" brand, distinguishing Hershey's Kisses from its competitors.
 A few years later in 1924, Hershey received a registered US trademark for its wrapper design, consisting of the conical foil wrapper plus the paper plume.

Later "KISSES" was printed on the paper plume, as well as other Kisses flavors. The company has also added special variety plumes (such as "cheesecake"). Special messages have been available for various occasions, including "Happy Halloween," "Get Spooky," "Gobble Gobble," "Lucky You," and "Love is in the air bud “

Advertising
"Christmas Bells" is a commercial in which Hershey's Kisses, fashioned as a handbell choir, perform the Christmas carol "We Wish You a Merry Christmas". It premiered in 1989 and has run each holiday season since in the United States; it is the longest-running television commercial for the Hershey brand. In 2020, Hershey's introduced a new "Bells to Blossoms" version of the ad, but was criticized for changing a 30-year running iconic holiday tradition. The company made the decision to air both the "classic" and newer versions of the holiday ad throughout the holiday season.

Ingredients and nutrition information
Beginning with its own consumer research into product information, in 2015 Hershey led the SmartLabel initiative. Hershey's was the first brand to adopt this Grocery Manufacturers Association mobile-scannable packaging standard. 

Kisses ingredients are cane sugar, milk, chocolate, cocoa butter, milk fat, lecithin, and natural flavor. A 1.45-ounce serving of Hershey's Kisses consists of seven Kisses pieces. Kisses has the following nutrition information:

 200 Calories
 Total fat 12g
 Saturated fat 7g
 Trans fat 0g
 Cholesterol 10 mg
 Sodium 35 mg
 Total carbohydrate 25g
 Dietary fiber 1g
 Total sugars 23g
 Protein 3g
 Vitamin D 25.8 iu
 Calcium 80.8 mg
 Iron 1.4 mg
 Potassium 147.7 mg

Additives
Hershey's Hugs and Hershey's Kisses Cookies 'N' Creme are made with the ingredient PGPR (Polyglycerol polyricinoleate, E476), which is used as a cheaper replacement for cocoa butter.

Broken tip controversy
On December 9, 2018, a member of the Wedding Cookie Table Community on Facebook posted a picture of a tip-less Kiss, wondering “Do this year’s Kisses look like this for you? Or are the tops broken off?” Other members of the group began to check their Kisses and as a result, dozens of others posted in the group that many, but not all, of them were found to be missing their tips. Twitter users soon picked up on the controversy and began to post pictures of Kisses that were also tip less.

Hershey representatives had responded to the group's messages. At first, customer service told consumers that it was deliberate so the pieces did not fall off after production, but later on, they said the company was looking into the cause. In a statement, Jeff Beckman, a Hershey spokesman, said, "We love our Kisses as much as our consumers. We make more than 70 million Kisses a day here in Hershey, PA, and we want each of them looking as great as they taste. The iconic, conical shape is one of the reasons families have loved Kisses for generations. We shape the tip on our classic, solid Milk and Dark Chocolate Kisses to create that iconic appearance. And while there has always been some variability in that process, we are working to improve the appearance because it's as important to us as it is to our fans."

References

External links

 
Zoe's Hershey Kiss Collection
An History of Hershey's Kisses

Brand name chocolate
The Hershey Company brands
Products introduced in 1907
Kosher food
American confectionery
Brand name confectionery